The Men's Downhill competition in the 2016 FIS Alpine Skiing World Cup involved eleven events, including the season finale in St. Moritz, Switzerland. 

Two-time discipline champion Aksel Lund Svindal from Norway got off to a fantastic start, winning four of the first five downhills of the season . . . and even winning the downhill run on the Lauberhorn in Wengen, Switzerland for the first time in his career (in his tenth attempt). Unfortunately, in the very next downhill race a week later, at the Streif downhill run in Kitzbühel (where Svindal had won a Super-G two days before), Svindal crashed and suffered an anterior cruciate ligament (ACL) tear in his right knee, ending his season. Because of poor visibility and dangerous winds, which already had led the course to be shortened before the race even started, the Streif downhill was stopped after just 30 skiers, the minimum number for the race to be deemed official -- but it already had produced three serious crashes among the best downhillers in the world. 

However, the surprise winner on the Streif was Peter Fill of Italy, who had started the day 245 points behind Svindal but picked up 100 for the win.  After four more downhills, and heading into the finals, Fill and Svindal were tied on points (436) with Italy's Dominik Paris only four points behind.  In the finals at St. Moritz, although both skied cautiously, Fill placed tenth, scoring 26 points, but Paris finished nineteenth and failed to score any points (as only the top 15 score at the finals), thus allowing Fill to become the first ever Italian man to win the downhill crystal globe.

Standings

DNF = Did Not Finish
DNS = Did Not Start

See also
 2016 Alpine Skiing World Cup – Men's summary rankings
 2016 Alpine Skiing World Cup – Men's Overall
 2016 Alpine Skiing World Cup – Men's Super-G
 2016 Alpine Skiing World Cup – Men's Giant Slalom
 2016 Alpine Skiing World Cup – Men's Slalom
 2016 Alpine Skiing World Cup – Men's Combined
 World Cup scoring system

References

External links
 Alpine Skiing at FIS website

External links
 

Men's Downhill
FIS Alpine Ski World Cup men's downhill discipline titles